Vital is the name of:

 Vital Ahačič (1933–1995), Slovenian accordionist and pedagogue
 Vital Alsar (born 1933), sailor
 Vital Aza (1851–1912), Spanish author, playwright, poet, and satirist
 Vital Balla, Congolese politician
 Vital Borkelmans (born 1963), Belgian footballer
 Vital Brazil (1865–1950), Brazilian physician, biomedical scientist, and immunologist
 Vital Bułyha (born 1980), former footballer
 Vital Cliche (1890–1976), Canadian politician
 Vital Cuinet (1833–1896), French geographer and orientalist
 Vital de Mortain, founder of Savigny Abbey
 Vital Dejkała (born 1984), retired Belarusian professional footballer
 Vital Eiselt (born 1941), Slovenian basketballer
 Vital Hajdučyk (born 1989), Belarusian professional footballer
 Vital Hébert (died 1867), landowner and political figure in New Brunswick
 Vital Heynen (born 1969), former Belgian volleyballer
 Vital Joachim Chamorin (1773–1811), French general officer
 Vital Kamerhe (born 1959), Congolese politician
 Vital Kibuk (born 1989), Belarusian professional footballer
 Vital Kramko (born 1941), chairman of "October" (Октябрь), an agricultural collective
 Vital Lahaye (born 1937), Belgian writer and teacher
 Vital Ledzianioŭ (born 1979), retired Belarusian professional footballer
 Vital Łańko (born 1977), professional Belarusian footballer
 Vital Makaŭčyk (born 1981), retired Belarusian professional footballer
 Vital N'Simba (born 1993), Angolan-born DR Congolese footballer
 Vital Nadzijeŭski (born 1981), retired Belarusian professional footballer
 Vital Panasiuk (born 1980), Belarusian professional footballer
 Vital Rahožkin (born 1976), retired Belarusian professional footballer
 Vital Roux (1766–1846), French businessman
 Vital Rymašeŭski (born 1975), Belarusian politician
 Vital Soares (1874–1933), Brazilian lawyer and politician
 Vital Šapiatoŭski (born 1983), Belarusian professional footballer
 Vital Taraščyk (born 1980), retired Belarusian professional footballer
 Vital Têtu (1799–1883), political figure in Lower Canada
 Vital Vaładziankoŭ (born 1976), retired Belarusian professional footballer
 Vital Miranda Whitford, founder of Asociación de Scouts de Nicaragua

See also 
 Saint Vital (disambiguation)
 Vital (disambiguation)